Tove is a Scandinavian given name that derives from the Old Norse name Tófa. The name is usually given to girls but occasionally to boys. It is also an alternative English spelling of the Hebrew name more commonly spelled Tovah or Tova.

Origins 
Some believe the name to be a shortening of Thorfrithr, "beautiful Thor" or "peace of Thor", though the carvings on the Sønder Vissing Runestone show the name to have come from the rune for Tyr, the ancient Norse and Germanic god of sky, justice and war. While the two middle characters suggest cattle/Aurochs, and cattle/wealth/Frey respectively, the last of the four runic characters also denotes gender. Tófa and Tófi appear to have been relatively popular names in the 10th and 11th centuries and are found in Anglo-Scandinavian court witness lists and later in the Domesday Book in their Latinised form. The personal name became a surname in medieval England, with spellings of Tovi, Tovie (16th century) and Tovey recorded in wills and church documents.

Notable women 
 Tove of the Obotrites, 10th-century Wendish princess
 Tove Alexandersson, Swedish orienteer
 Tove Ditlevsen, Danish poet and author
 Tove Edfeldt, Swedish actress
 Tove Fergo, Danish vicar and politician
 Tove Jansson, Finnish artist and author
 Tove Lindbo Larsen, Danish politician
 Tove Lo, Swedish singer
 Tove Maës, Danish actress
 Tove Nilsen, Norwegian writer
 Tove Nielsen (politician), Danish politician
 Tove Styrke, Swedish singer
 Birte Tove (1945–2016), Danish actress and nude model

Notable men 
 Tove (sculptor), 12th-century Scanian sculptor
 Tove Christensen, Canadian actor and producer

Fictional characters 
 a legendary young woman, mistress of the Danish King Waldemar, and subject of a poem by Jens Peter Jacobsen best known for its musical setting as the Gurre-Lieder of Arnold Schoenberg
 a fictional, slithy creature created by Lewis Carroll that appears in his poem Jabberwocky

See also
 High Tove, a mountain in the English Lake District
 River Tove, tributary of the Great Ouse in England
 TOVE Project, an ontology for modelling enterprises
 Tove (film), a 2020 biopic about Tove Jansson

Tova (disambiguation)

References

Scandinavian feminine given names
Swedish feminine given names
Danish feminine given names
Norwegian feminine given names